Alexander William "Sandy" Roberton (7 July 1942 – 25 July 2022) was a British record producer and music business owner, whose 60-year career spanning record production, artist management, record label ownership and producer management made him an influential player in the music industry.

After a brief early career as a recording artist in the mid-1960s, he moved into music publishing, running Chess Records' London offices and promoting the songs from their music publishing companies, Arc, Regent and Jewel. With record producer Mike Vernon, he helped set up the publishing for the Blue Horizon record label during the British blues boom that saw acts like John Mayall's Bluesbreakers, Chicken Shack and Fleetwood Mac achieve success. In 1968 he established his own record production and artist management company, September Productions, and became one of the leading lights of the folk rock era of the 1970s, managing and producing bands such as The Liverpool Scene, Steeleye Span and Plainsong.  In 1977, he established his own record label, Rockburgh Records, releasing some 40 albums and singles by various artists, including four solo albums by singer Iain Matthews, formerly of Fairport Convention and Matthews Southern Comfort.

In 1980 he moved into producer management, establishing his Worlds End Management company in London, claimed as the first of its kind to represent the interests of producers, mixers and sound engineers.  He is also credited with establishing the 'points' system whereby his clients would receive royalties for the work they did on producing artists' records. He moved its base to Los Angeles in 1985, becoming a US citizen in 2004, and ran his business there until his death, along the way founding two more record labels in the 2000s, Beverly Martel and IAMSOUND. Over four decades, Worlds End became the leading management company in its field, with over 75 producers on its books during the 1990s and early 2000s.

Roberton died in London aged 80, on 25 July 2022, from cancer.

Early years
Roberton was born in Edinburgh, Scotland on 7 July 1942. When he was six years old, his parents emigrated to Africa - his father Robert was a tractor technician involved in the British Government's post-war Tanganyika Groundnut Scheme in East Africa.  In consequence, he was raised firstly in Tanganyika (now Tanzania), and latterly in Kenya, where as a teenager he had his first taste of the local music scene in a group called Les Hombres.

 
Intent on a career in the burgeoning music business of the early 1960s, Roberton moved to London in 1963. By day he took jobs at Olivetti typewriters and the department store C&A to earn enough money to exist, whilst nights were spent fashioning his singing career. He began playing in a venue called the Dive Bar at the King's Head pub in Soho, frequently joined on stage by his old school bandmate Rick Tykiff. The pair were soon signed up to a record deal by record producer Tom Springfield (brother of singer Dusty Springfield) and, as Rick and Sandy, recorded several singles in 1965 for the Decca and Mercury labels, including ‘Half As Much’, ‘I Remember Baby’ and ‘Lost My Girl’. Both of the latter two songs were produced and arranged by songwriter Les Reed who would later become well known as the writer of several hits for Tom Jones including ‘It’s Not Unusual’ and ‘Delilah’.

After Rick Tykiff decided to leave the music business, Roberton had a solo single released on Columbia in 1966 under the name Sandy, a cover of Neil Diamond’s ‘Solitary Man’; and, backed by a group called Fleur De Lys, his version of the Bob Dylan song, ‘Baby You’ve Been On My Mind’ was released on Polydor in 1967 under the name Lucien Alexander.

By the time of that release, however, Roberton was already working in music publishing, running the London office of Chess Records’ publishing companies Arc Music, Regent Music and Jewel Music through the offices of music publishers Chappell & Co. at 52 Maddox Street in Mayfair. Their writers, amongst others, included such Blues greats as Jimmy Reed, John Lee Hooker, Willie Dixon, Howlin’ Wolf, Muddy Waters, and Bo Diddley. He also ran the London office of Bill Lowery's company Lowery Music, whose writers included Joe South, Tommy Roe, Mac Davis, and Billy Joe Royal.

Roberton's job consisted mostly of convincing UK artists to record songs from the catalogues of these companies. Georgie Fame's cover of Billy Stewart's 'Sitting In The Park', which got to #12 in the UK music charts in December 1966, was one of his main achievements; and the Jewel Music song ‘It Ain’t Right’ by Little Walter, was  one of several Blues covers on John Mayall's seminal 1966 album Blues Breakers with Eric Clapton, also colloquially known as 'The Beano Album' from its cover picture.

That album resulted in a life-long connection between Roberton and its producer, Mike Vernon. It would lead to Roberton leaving Chappell to team up with Vernon and his brother Richard at Blue Horizon, a specialist blues label that Mike Vernon had started with childhood friend Neil Slaven in 1965. Together they set up two Blue Horizon music publishing companies, Goodie Two Shoes Music and Uncle Doris Music. The label became synonymous with the cream of British blues in the late 1960s releasing music by Chicken Shack, Duster Bennett, Christine Perfect (later Christine McVie) and Fleetwood Mac, including their eponymously named 1968 debut album.

In 1967 Roberton moved into music production for the first time, producing two singles by The Chocolate Watch Band, an English band featuring Gary Osborne, who would later go on to write several hits for Elton John in the early 1980s.

September Productions
Sandy Roberton formed his own music production and artist management company in 1968, calling it September Productions Ltd. after the month in which it was formed. One of the first artists to sign up with him were The Liverpool Scene, the poetry and music collective from Liverpool featuring poet Adrian Henri and guitarist Andy Roberts, together with Mike Evans, Mike Hart, Percy Jones and Brian Dodson. Roberton co-produced their first album Amazing Adventures Of along with DJ John Peel who had championed their music on his BBC radio shows.

In the space of just two years under Roberton's management, Liverpool Scene would release four albums via a deal he struck with record label RCA to supply them with albums by artists he now managed; play on the same day as Bob Dylan at the 1969 Isle of Wight Festival in front of some 150,000 music fans; tour on a three-act bill with Blodwyn Pig and Led Zeppelin which included playing at the Royal Albert Hall; and break up in May 1970 in the wake of a somewhat financially disastrous US tour.

A first solo album by Andy Roberts, Home Grown, produced by Roberton and recorded during Roberts' latter days with Liverpool Scene, was released on RCA in March 1970. A second album, Everyone, by Roberts' post-Liverpool Scene band Everyone, was released on the B & C record label in 1971 in a deal Roberton negotiated when the RCA relationship came to an end. Talking with journalist Dave Thompson in Goldmine magazine in November 2013, Roberton said “I had an arrangement with RCA, and was taking most of my September Productions acts to them. When that relationship finished, I was approached by Lee Gopthal who was the co-owner of Trojan Records saying he wanted to get into different areas of music. He'd started B & C, and was distributing Charisma Records, but he wanted to sign his own acts. I started signing and producing and releasing through B & C."

By the time the Everyone album was released, however, the band itself was no longer in existence and both Roberton and Roberts had already begun working with singer Iain Matthews whose debut solo LP, If You Saw Thro' My Eyes, was released in May 1971, the first of a three-album deal with Vertigo Records. He would be brought in as producer at Andy Roberts' suggestion when the original producer, Paul Samwell-Smith, began to not turn up to recording sessions - though he remained uncredited on the album's label and artwork.   It was the beginning of a long relationship with Matthews that would see him produce the third album of the Vertigo deal, Journeys From Gospel Oak (recorded in November 1972 but not released until 1974) and four more Matthews solo albums in the late 1970s/early 1980s when he formed his own record label, Rockburgh Records.

In his early days as a producer, Roberton's preferred studio in which to record his acts was Sound Techniques in Old Church Street, Chelsea, an 18th-century former dairy-turned-recording studio by sound engineers Geoff Frost and John Wood in 1965. His September Productions stable of artists included Scottish folk singer Shelagh McDonald, singer Keith Christmas, and flautist Harold McNair, all of whom had albums produced by Roberton and released on B & C in the early 1970s. English folk rock band Decameron were another of his artists, as were Spirogyra, American singer Marc Ellington, plus several artists on the 1970s folk scene including Tim Hart and Maddy Prior, Gay and Terry Woods; and later, in the early 1980s, singer John Martyn who he would both manage and produce.

His biggest breakthrough, however, was with Steeleye Span, the British folk rock band formed by Ashley Hutchings following his departure from Fairport Convention in November 1969. Roberton produced their first three albums - Hark! The Village Wait released on RCA in 1970, plus Please to See the King released on the B & C label in 1971 and Ten Man Mop, or Mr. Reservoir Butler Rides Again released on Pegasus, also in 1971. At that time Roberton became one of the go-to producers for the cream of British folk rock, along with John Wood, Joe Boyd, and Tony Cox. In addition to Steeleye Span, he also co-produced with Ashley Hutchings the album No Roses by Shirley Collins and The Albion Country Band, which was nominated as the 'Folk Album Of The Year' in August 1971 by renowned Melody Maker journalist Karl Dallas.

Sandy Roberton also managed and produced the folk rock/country rock band Plainsong, formed at the end of 1971 by Andy Roberts and Iain Matthews, alongside pianist and bass player David Richards and guitarist Bobby Ronga. Their debut album In Search of Amelia Earhart produced by Roberton received critical acclaim upon its release in October 1972 - Record Mirror called it "The Contemporary Folk Record of the Year"; and rock journalist Charles Shaar Murray, reviewing the album in New Musical Express, described it as "one of the classic albums of 1972".

Despite all the acclaim, the album did not sell well and the band broke up in somewhat acrimonious circumstances at the end of December 1972, with both Matthews and Roberts pursuing separate careers as solo artists - Matthews signing up as a solo artist for Elektra Records and heading for California to work with former Monkee-turned-record producer Mike Nesmith,  and Roberts continuing to record two more albums as a solo artist with Sandy Roberton as producer, Urban Cowboy and Andy Roberts And The Great Stampede, both released in 1973 on the Elektra label.

Matthews and Roberton would also collaborate again in 1973, co-producing the  album If It Was So Simple by Longdancer, a folk rock band that included Dave Stewart who would later find fame in the 1980s as one half of The Eurythmics alongside singer Annie Lennox.

Rockburgh Records
In 1977 Sandy Roberton formed his own record label, Rockburgh Records - the name was derived from a combination of Rock ‘n’ Roll and Edinburgh, his place of birth. Rockburgh Records existed from 1977 to 1981 and during that time released just over 40 albums and singles by a wide roster of artists, including amongst others The Woods Band (Gay and Terry Woods), British singer-songwriter Allan Taylor, Australian rock band Jo Jo Zep & The Falcons, former Dr. Feelgood guitarist Wilko Johnson, and, some five years on from Plainsong, once again Iain Matthews.

Roberton would produce four albums for Matthews in the late 70s/early 80s – Stealin’ Home (1978), Siamese Friends (1979), Spot of Interference (1980) and Shook (1984) – with ‘Shake It’ from Stealin’ Home reaching #13 in the US Billboard Hot 100 in February 1979 giving Matthews his first hit single since topping the UK charts in 1970 with Matthews Southern Comfort's ‘Woodstock’. All four albums were remastered in 2005 by BGO Records as part of a 2-on-1 series of Iain Matthews re-releases, and again in March 2022 along with numerous demos, outtakes and live recordings as part of a 6-CD box set from Cherry Red Records, I Can’t Fade Away: The Rockburgh Years (1978-1984).

In 1980, Roberton and Matthews also released a 27-track double album compilation of Matthews material, Discreet Repeat, covering not only tracks from the Rockburgh albums they had made together, but also from Matthews’ earlier solo 1970s albums, plus some tracks from the Plainsong ‘Amelia’ album. A shorter 21-track version of that Roberton-Matthews compilation would later be released on CD by Line Records in 1988.

Worlds End Management
With the folk rock era of the 70s having passed its peak, the beginning of the 1980s would see the end of Sandy Roberton's direct involvement as a record producer, his focus now shifting into working with and managing other record producers. The last of the 55 albums Roberton is credited with producing was Well Kept Secret, by John Martyn, who Roberton had taken over managing in 1980. It was the second of two John Martyn albums released on WEA (the first being 1981's Glorious Fool produced by Phil Collins) and commercially his most successful.

Along with business partner Paul Brown, Roberton founded the Worlds End Management Company in Chelsea, London in 1980, named after the area of Chelsea in which they had their offices.  The company billed itself as  “probably the first full service company to ever solely represent record producers, mixers and sound engineers”. One of the first clients managed by Worlds End was British record producer, Tim Palmer, who Roberton first encountered as a tape operator in the 1980s. In the event Palmer would become Roberton's client for nearly 40 years, working with such artists as Robert Plant, David Bowie, Tears For Fears, Pearl Jam and many more.

Roberton moved Worlds End's base to Los Angeles in 1985, when he became its sole owner and his company made its name representing successful producers like The Matrix, the songwriting collective made up of Lauren Christy, Graham Edwards and Scott Spock, that had a big hit in 2002 with Avril Lavigne’s debut studio album Let’s Go, and later went on to work with artists such as Britney Spears, Shakira, Korn and Liz Phair.

In 2007 Roberton set up the independent record label Beverly Martel which released music by acts such as The Philistines Jr., Amelia Carey, the High Divers, Josh Difford and many more. And in 2007 along with his daughter Niki, he also co-founded the IAMSOUND record label that helped launched the careers of artists such Florence and the Machine, Lord Huron, Nikki Lane and Charli XCX.

Over four decades, Worlds End became the leading management company in its field, with over 75 producers on its books during the 1990s and early 2000s. The company, which Roberton continued to run until the end of his life, currently represents producers and mixers including Tim Palmer, Stephen Lipson, Larry Klein, Brad Wood, Stephen Hague, Ted Hutt and many others.

Personal life

Sandy Roberton died in London aged 80 on 25 July 2022 after a short battle with cancer. He is survived by his wife, Dinah (née Cullen), his former PA at music publishers Chappell & Co. whom he married in November 1968, and his two children, Christian and Nicola.

Like their father, both of Roberton’s children have established highly successful careers in the entertainment industry. His son Christian Roberton{{efn|Christian Roberton started his career in the traditional drawn animation business in the mid-1990s, working for a number of London-based companies on commercial and television series production. This led him to the animation production company Uli Meyer Studios, where he became Company Manager running all aspects of the business from commercial through to feature production.

He joined the Moving Picture Company (MPC) in 2003, where he started as a VFX Production Manager and within five years became Managing Director of Film. During his time as MD, MPC Film opened studios in Vancouver, Los Angeles, Bangalore and Montreal and now has more than 3,000 artists and production crew working with them. He is credited as Visual Effects Executive Producer on numerous successful box office films of the 2000s and 2010s including Alien vs. Predator, Quantum Of Solace, Prometheus and The Mummy, amongst others. 
}} is President of Technicolour Creative Studios, the largest visual effects company in the world, while his daughter Nicola, better known as Niki Roberton, is currently Senior Vice President, Creative at RCA Records who she joined in September 2022.

Tributes

Numerous tributes were paid to Sandy Roberton when news of his death spread across the music industry in late July 2022. He was described in Billboard as a "trailblazing manager of producers and engineers";  as "an influential manager who helped pioneer the concept of representing music production clients", and as "one of the music industry's most significant unsung, behind-the-scenes heroes."

Among the various accolades were the following from veteran musician and songwriter Andy Roberts, record producer and mixing engineer Tim Palmer, songwriter Lauren Christy from The Matrix; and record producer Stephen Lipson.

Notes

References

Recommended reading
 Ian Clayton: In Search Of Plainsong, Route Publishing, 2022; 
 Iain Matthews with Ian Clayton: Thro' My Eyes: A Memoir, Route Publishing, 2018; 
 Clinton Heylin: What We Did Instead Of Holidays: A History Of Fairport Convention And Its Extended Folk-Rock Family''. Route Publishing, 2018; 

1942 births
2022 deaths
People from Edinburgh
Scottish record producers
Place of death missing